Osric is an Anglo-Saxon name and may refer to:
 

People

Anglo-Saxon kings
 Osric of Deira, king of the Anglo-Saxon kingdom of Deira in the 630s
 Osric of Northumbria, king of the Anglo-Saxon kingdom of Northumbria in the 720s
 Osric of Sussex, king of the Anglo-Saxon kingdom of Sussex in the early 8th century
 Osric of the Hwicce, king of the Anglo-Saxon kingdom of Hwicce in the late 7th century

Other people
 Osric Chau, actor

Other uses
 OSRIC, short for 'Old School Reference and Index Compilation', a fantasy role-playing game
 A character in William Shakespeare's play Hamlet
 Osric, a prince in Roger Zelazny's fantasy series The Chronicles of Amber

English masculine given names